USS Catahoula Parish (LST-528) was an  built for the United States Navy during World War II. Named for Catahoula Parish, Louisiana, she was the only U.S. Naval vessel to bear the name.

LST-528 was laid down on 13 November 1943 at Jeffersonville, Indiana by the Jeffersonville Boat & Machine Company; launched on 11 January 1944; sponsored by Mrs. Madge Medlock Watt; and commissioned on 29 February 1944.

Service history

During World War II, LST-528 was assigned to the European Theater and participated in the Invasion of Normandy in June 1944. She returned to the United States and was placed in reserve in Florida until the outbreak of the Korean War. During the war, she was part of a six-ship flotilla which took supplies to Thule, Greenland, where the US Air Force was building a base.

LST-528 was decommissioned in March, 1954. The ship was named USS Catahoula Parish (LST-528) on 1 July 1955. She was struck from the Navy list on 21 November 1960, and sold to the Marquette Cement Company for conversion to a bulk cement carrier.
 
LST-528 earned one battle star for World War II service.

References

 
 

LST-491-class tank landing ships
World War II amphibious warfare vessels of the United States
Cold War amphibious warfare vessels of the United States
Catahoula Parish, Louisiana
Ships built in Jeffersonville, Indiana
1944 ships